William George McMillan (November 25, 1944 – December 2, 2015) was an American actor, producer, and director.

Early life
McMillan was born on November 25, 1944, in Steubenville, Ohio to William Claude and Nellie McMillan. While attending Weir High School, he played both offense and defense for the football team that won the 1960 State Championship. McMillan attended Washington & Jefferson College where he received a BA degree. He attended Boston University where he received a Masters of Fine Arts.

Career

Film
In the 1970s, McMillan moved to California to pursue a career in acting. In 1972, he started his career with White Rat as Lieutenant. McMillan next starred as David in the 1973 film The Crazies. In 1976, he starred in The Enforcer, the third in the Dirty Harry film series, as Lt. Dobbs. In 1983, McMillan starred in Tin Man as Artie. In 1986, he starred in Oliver Stone's Salvador as Colonel Bentley Hyde Sr.

Television
McMillan guest starred in a number of television shows including Three's Company, Charlie's Angels, Knight Rider, Hunter, Knots Landing, Matlock, and Diagnosis: Murder. In 1984, he would land the role of Boris Roskov on ABC's General Hospital.

Later career
McMillan would enter into a different medium, Videos. He was in 1986's Cards of Death as  Captain Twain, 1990's  Dark Romances Vol. 1 as a bartender, and 1994's Schemes as a mean junkman.

Personal life and death
McMillan married Laura Bahrs in 1981. They had 4 children.

He died on December 2, 2015 in Burbank, California. He was survived by his wife, Laura and their four children, and a sister.

Filmography

Film

Television

Video

References

Sources

External links

1944 births
2015 deaths
People from Steubenville, Ohio
Washington & Jefferson College alumni
Boston College alumni
20th-century American male actors
21st-century American male actors
American male film actors
American male television actors
Male actors from Ohio